An Abbreviated Life is a memoir  by Ariel S. Leve. In this book she tells the story of her childhood and her mother, American poet and feminist, Sandra Hochman. She described the physical and emotional abuse she faced in her childhood, and how she grew up in a dysfunctional family.

References 

2016 non-fiction books
American memoirs
HarperCollins books